Maculatoscelis ascalaphoides is a species of praying mantis in the family Amorphoscelidae. It is found in central and western Africa (Angola, Ghana, Guinea, Cameroon, Tanzania, and the Congo River region.

See also
List of mantis genera and species

References

Amorphoscelidae
Mantodea of Africa
Insects described in 1908